Kedar Shinde (Marathi pronunciation: [ked̪aːɾ ʃin̪d̪e]; born 16 January 1973) is an Indian film director and screenwriter from Mumbai, India.

Personal life and family

Kedar Shinde was born on 16 January 1973 in Mumbai, India. Shinde completed his school education in Mumbai. He is the maternal grandson of noted Marathi Folk Singer, Shahir Sable. His maternal aunt – Charusheela Sable is a Marathi actor of repute

Shinde is married to Bela Shinde in 1996. The couple has a daughter, Sana Shinde (born 1998).

Career

He had started his career with Maharashtrachi Lokdhara (Folk dances of Maharashtra) – Maharashtrachi Lokadhara had performed all over India as a renowned troupe formed by Shahir Sable showcasing all native dance forms of Maharashtra.

Films

TV Shows

Plays

References

External links
 

Film directors from Mumbai
Marathi film directors
Screenwriters from Mumbai
Living people
1973 births